The Druze (or  ,) are an Arabic-speaking esoteric ethnoreligious group from Western Asia who adhere to the Druze faith, an Abrahamic, monotheistic, syncretic, and ethnic religion based on the teachings of Hamza ibn Ali ibn Ahmad and ancient Greek philosophers like Plato, Aristotle, Pythagoras, and Zeno of Citium. Adherents of the Druze religion call themselves "the Monotheists" or "the Unitarians" (al-Muwaḥḥidūn).

The Epistles of Wisdom is the foundational and central text of the Druze faith. The Druze faith incorporates elements of Isma'ilism, Christianity, Gnosticism, Neoplatonism, Zoroastrianism, Buddhism, Hinduism, Pythagoreanism, and other philosophies and beliefs, creating a distinct and secretive theology based on an esoteric interpretation of scripture, which emphasizes the role of the mind and truthfulness. Druze believe in theophany and reincarnation. Druze believe that at the end of the cycle of rebirth, which is achieved through successive reincarnations, the soul is united with the Cosmic Mind.

The Druze have a special reverence for Shuaib, who they believe is the same person as the Biblical Jethro. The Druze believe that Adam, Noah, Abraham, Moses, Jesus, Muhammad, and Isma'il ibn Ja'far were prophets. Druze tradition also honors and reveres Salman the Persian, al-Khidr (who they identify as Elijah, reborn as John the Baptist and Saint George), Job, Luke the Evangelist, and others as "mentors" and "prophets".

The Druze do not permit outsiders to convert to their religion. Marriage outside the Druze faith is rare and strongly discouraged. Most Druze religious practices are kept secret.Even though the faith originally developed out of Isma'ilism, the Druze are not Muslims. The Druze faith is one of the major religious groups in the Levant, with between 800,000 and a million adherents. They are found primarily in Lebanon, Syria, and Israel, with small communities in Jordan. They make up 5.5% of the population of Lebanon, 3% of Syria and 1.6% of Israel. The oldest and most densely-populated Druze communities exist in Mount Lebanon and in the south of Syria around Jabal al-Druze (literally the "Mountain of the Druze"). 

The Druze community played a critically important role in shaping the history of the Levant, where it continues to play a significant political role. As a religious minority in every country in which they are found, they have frequently experienced persecution by different Muslim regimes, including contemporary Islamic extremism.

Etymology 

The name Druze is derived from the name of Muhammad bin Ismail Nashtakin ad-Darazī (from Persian , "seamster") who was an early preacher. Although the Druze consider ad-Darazī a heretic, the name has been used to identify them, possibly by their historical opponents as a way to attach their community with ad-Darazi's poor reputation.

Before becoming public, the movement was secretive and held closed meetings in what was known as Sessions of Wisdom.

In 1016 ad-Darazi and his followers openly proclaimed their beliefs and called people to join them, causing riots in Cairo against the Unitarian movement including Hamza bin Ali and his followers. This led to the suspension of the movement for one year and the expulsion of ad-Darazi and his supporters.

Although the Druze religious books describe ad-Darazi as the "insolent one" and as the "calf" who is narrow-minded and hasty, the name "Druze" is still used for identification and for historical reasons. In 1018, ad-Darazi was assassinated for his teachings; some sources claim that he was executed by Al-Hakim bi-Amr Allah.

Some authorities see in the name "Druze" a descriptive epithet, derived from Arabic  ("she who studies"). Others have speculated that the word comes from the Persian word  ( "bliss") or from Shaykh Hussayn ad-Darazī, who was one of the early converts to the faith. In the early stages of the movement, the word "Druze" is rarely mentioned by historians, and in Druze religious texts only the word Muwaḥḥidūn ("Unitarian") appears. The only early Arab historian who mentions the Druze is the eleventh century Christian scholar Yahya of Antioch, who clearly refers to the heretical group created by ad-Darazī, rather than the followers of Hamza ibn 'Alī. As for Western sources, Benjamin of Tudela, the Jewish traveler who passed through Lebanon in or around 1165, was one of the first European writers to refer to the Druze by name. The word  ("Druzes") occurs in an early Hebrew edition of his travels, but it is clear that this is a scribal error. Be that as it may, he described the Druze as "mountain dwellers, monotheists, who believe in 'soul eternity' and reincarnation". He also stated that "they loved the Jews".

Location 
The number of Druze people worldwide is between 800,000 and one million, with the vast majority residing in the Levant. Druze people reside primarily in Syria, Lebanon, Israel and Jordan. 

The Institute of Druze Studies estimates that in 1998 40–50% of Druze live in Syria, 30–40% in Lebanon, 6–7% in Israel, and 1–2% in Jordan. About 2% of the Druze population are also scattered within other countries in the Middle East, and according to The Institute of Druze Studies there were approximately 20,000 Druzes in the United States in 1998. According to scholar Colbert C. Held of University of Nebraska, Lincoln the number of Druze people worldwide is around one million, with about 45% to 50% live in Syria, 35% to 40% live in Lebanon, and less than 10% live in Israel, with recently there has been a growing Druze diaspora.

Large communities of Druze also live outside the Middle East, in Australia, Canada, Europe, Latin America (mainly Venezuela, Colombia and Brazil), the United States, and West Africa. They are Arabs who speak the Arabic language and follow a social pattern very similar to those of the other peoples of the Levant (eastern Mediterranean). In 2021 the largest Druze communities outside the Middle East are in Venezuela (60,000) and in the United States (50,000). According to the Los Angeles Times in 2017 "there are about 30,000 in the United States, with the largest concentration in Southern California".

History

Early history 
The story of the creation of the Druze faith in the days between 1017 and 1018 is dominated by three men and their struggle for influence.  
 Hamza ibn Ali ibn Ahmad was an Ismaili mystic and scholar from Khorasan, who arrived in Fatimid Egypt in 1014 or 1016 and began to preach a Muwaḥḥidūn ("Unitarian") doctrine. 
  al-Hakim bi-Amr Allah, the sixth Fātimid caliph, became a central figure in the faith being preached by Hamza ibn Ali ibn Ahmad.
  Muhammad bin Ismail Nashtakin ad-Darazi arrived in Cairo in 1015 or 1017, possibly from Bukhara, joined the movement and became an important preacher and prophet.

Hamza ibn Ali ibn Ahmad arrives in Cairo 
Hamza ibn Ali ibn Ahmad, an Ismaili mystic and scholar from Zozan, Khorasan, in the Samanid Empire. arrived in Fatimid Egypt in 1014 or 1016. He assembled a group of scholars that met regularly in the Raydan Mosque, near the Al-Hakim Mosque. In 1017, Hamza began to preach a Muwaḥḥidūn (Unitarian) doctrine.

Hamza gained the support of the Fātimid caliph al-Hakim bi-Amr Allah, who issued a decree promoting religious freedom and eventually became a central figure in the Druze faith.

al-Darazi arrives in Cairo 
Little is known about the early life of al-Darazi. According to most sources, he was born in Bukhara. He is believed to have been of Persian origins and his title al-Darazi is Persian in origin, meaning "the tailor". He arrived in Cairo in 1015, or 1017, after which he joined the newly emerged Druze movement.

Al-Darazi was converted early to the Unitarian faith and became one of its early preachers. At that time, the movement enlisted a large number of adherents. As the number of his followers grew, he became obsessed with his leadership and gave himself the title "The Sword of the Faith". Al-Darazi argued that he should be the leader of the daʻwah rather than Hamza ibn Ali and gave himself the title "Lord of the Guides" because Caliph al-Hakim referred to Hamza as "Guide of the Consented". It is said that al-Darazi allowed wine, forbidden marriages and taught metempsychosis although this may be exaggeration by contemporary and later historians and polemicists.

This attitude led to disputes between Ad-Darazi and Hamza ibn Ali, who disliked his behavior and his arrogance. In the Epistles of Wisdom, Hamza ibn Ali ibn Ahmad warns al-Darazi, saying, "Faith does not need a sword to aid it", but al-Darazi ignored Hamza's warnings and continued to challenge the Imam.

al-Darazi issues the unitarian call 
The divine call or unitarian call is the Druze period of time that was opened at sunset on Thursday 30 May 1017 by Ad-Darazi. The call summoned people to a true unitarian belief that removed all attributes (wise, just, outside, inside, etc.) from God. It promoted absolute monotheism and the concepts of supporting your fellow man, true speech and pursuit of oneness with God. These concepts superseded all ritual, law and dogma and requirements for pilgrimage, fasting, holy days, prayer, charity, devotion, creed and particular worship of any prophet or person was downplayed. Sharia was opposed and Druze traditions started during the call continue today, such as meeting for reading, prayer and social gathering on a Thursday instead of a Friday at Khalwats instead of mosques. Such gatherings and traditions were not compulsory and people were encouraged to pursue a state of compliance with the real law of nature governing the universe. Epistle thirteen of the Epistles of Wisdom called it "A spiritual doctrine without any ritualistic imposition".

The time of the call was seen as a revolution of truth, with missionaries preaching its message all around the Middle East. These messengers were sent out with the Druze epistles and took written vows from believers, whose souls are thought to still exist in the Druze of today. The souls of those who took the vows during the call are believed to be continuously reincarnating in successive generations of Druze until the return of al-Hakim to proclaim a second Divine call and establish a Golden Age of justice and peace for all.

al-Darazi is executed 
By 1018, al-Darazi had gathered around him partisans – "Darazites" – who believed that universal reason became incarnated in Adam at the beginning of the world, was then passed to the prophets, then into Ali, and then into his descendants, the Fatimid Caliphs. Al-Darazi wrote a book laying out this doctrine, but when he read from his book in the principal mosque in Cairo, it caused riots and protests against his claims and many of his followers were killed. 

Hamza ibn Ali rejected al-Darazi's ideology, calling him "the insolent one and Satan". The controversy led Caliph al-Hakim to suspend the Druze daʻwah in 1018.

In an attempt to gain the support of al-Hakim, al-Darazi started preaching that al-Hakim and his ancestors were the incarnation of God. An inherently modest man, al-Hakim did not believe that he was God, and felt al-Darazi was trying to depict himself as a new prophet. In 1018 Al-Hakim had al-Darazi executed, leaving Hamza the sole leader of the new faith and al-Darazi considered to be a renegade.

Disappearance of Al-Hakim 
Al-Hakim disappeared one night while out on his evening ride – presumably assassinated, perhaps at the behest of his formidable elder sister Sitt al-Mulk. The Druze believe he went into Occultation with Hamza ibn Ali and three other prominent preachers, leaving the care of the "Unitarian missionary movement" to a new leader, al-Muqtana Baha'uddin.

The call was suspended briefly between 19 May 1018 and 9 May 1019 during the apostasy of al-Darazi and again between 1021 and 1026 during a period of persecution by Ali az-Zahir for those who had sworn the oath to accept the call. 

Persecutions started forty days after the disappearance into Occultation of al-Hakim, who was thought to have been converting people to the Unitarian faith for over twenty years prior. Al-Hakim convinced some heretical followers such as al-Darazi of his soteriological divinity and officially declared the Divine call after issuing a decree promoting religious freedom.

Al-Hakim was replaced by his underage son, ʻAlī al-Zahir. The Unitarian/Druze movement acknowledged al-Zahir as the caliph, but continued to regard Hamzah as its Imam. The young caliph's regent, Sitt al-Mulk, ordered the army to destroy the movement in 1021. At the same time, Bahāʼ al-Dīn was assigned the leadership of the Unitarians by Hamza.

For the next seven years, the Druze faced extreme persecution by the new caliph, al-Zahir, who wanted to eradicate the faith. This was the result of a power struggle inside of the Fatimid empire in which the Druze were viewed with suspicion because of their refusal to recognize the new caliph as their Imam. Many spies, mainly the followers of al-Darazi, joined the Unitarian movement in order to infiltrate the Druze community. The spies set about agitating trouble and soiling the reputation of the Druze. This resulted in friction with the new caliph who clashed militarily with the Druze community. The clashes ranged from Antioch to Alexandria, where tens of thousands of Druze were slaughtered by the Fatimid army, "this mass persecution known by the Druze as the period of the mihna". The largest massacre was at Antioch, where 5000 prominent Druze were killed, followed by that of Aleppo. As a result, the faith went underground, in hope of survival, as those captured were either forced to renounce their faith or be killed. Druze survivors "were found principally in southern Lebanon and Syria". 

In 1038, two years after the death of al-Zahir, the Druze movement was able to resume because the new leadership that replaced him had friendly political ties with at least one prominent Druze leader.

Closing of the unitarian call 
In 1043, Baha al-Din al-Muqtana declared that the sect would no longer accept new pledges, and since that time proselytism has been prohibited awaiting al-Hakim's return at the Last Judgment to usher in a new Golden Age.

Some Druze and non-Druze scholars like Samy Swayd and Sami Makarem state that this confusion is due to confusion about the role of the early preacher al-Darazi, whose teachings the Druze rejected as heretical. These sources assert that al-Hakim rejected al-Darazi's claims of divinity, and ordered the elimination of his movement while supporting that of Hamza ibn Ali.

During the Crusades 

Wadi al-Taym, in Lebanon, was one of the two most important centers of Druze missionary activity in the 11th century. And that was the first area where the Druze appeared in the historical record under the name "Druze". It is generally considered the "birthplace of the Druze faith".

It was during the period of Crusader rule in Levant (1099–1291) that the Druze first emerged into the full light of history in the Gharb region of the Chouf Mountains. As powerful warriors serving the Muslim rulers of Damascus against the Crusades, the Druze were given the task of keeping watch over the crusaders in the seaport of Beirut, with the aim of preventing them from making any encroachments inland. Subsequently, the Druze chiefs of the Gharb placed their considerable military experience at the disposal of the Mamluk rulers of Egypt (1250–1516); first, to assist them in putting an end to what remained of Crusader rule in coastal Levant, and later to help them safeguard the Lebanese coast against Crusader retaliation by sea.

In the early period of the Crusader era, the Druze feudal power was in the hands of two families, the Tanukhs and the Arslans. From their fortresses in the Gharb area (now in Aley District of southern Mount Lebanon Governorate), the Tanukhs led their incursions into the Phoenician coast and finally succeeded in holding Beirut and the marine plain against the Franks. Because of their fierce battles with the Crusaders, the Druze earned the respect of the Sunni Muslim caliphs and thus gained important political powers. After the middle of the twelfth century, the Ma'an family superseded the Tanukhs in Druze leadership. The origin of the family goes back to a Prince Ma'an who made his appearance in the Lebanon in the days of the 'Abbasid caliph al-Mustarshid (1118–35 CE). The Ma'ans chose for their abode the Chouf District in south-western Lebanon (southern Mount Lebanon Governorate), overlooking the maritime plain between Beirut and Sidon, and made their headquarters in Baaqlin, which is still a leading Druze village. They were invested with feudal authority by Sultan Nur ad-Din and furnished respectable contingents to the Muslim ranks in their struggle against the Crusaders.

Ibn Taymiyyah believed that Druze had a high level of infidelity, besides being apostates. Thus, they were not trustworthy and should not be forgiven. He taught also that Muslims cannot accept Druze penitence nor keep them alive, and Druze property should be confiscated, and their women enslaved. Having cleared the holy land of the Franks, the Mamluk sultans of Egypt turned their attention to the schismatic Muslims of Syria. In 1305, after the issuing of a fatwa by the scholar Ibn Taymiyyah, calling for jihad against all non-Sunni Muslims like the Druze, Alawites, Ismaili, and Twelver Shia Muslims, al-Malik al-Nasir inflicted a disastrous defeat on the Druze at Keserwan, and forced outward compliance on their part to Orthodox Sunni Islam. Later, under the Ottoman, they were severely attacked at Saoufar in the 1585 Ottoman expedition, after the Ottomans claimed that they assaulted their caravans near Tripoli. As a result of the Ottoman experience with the rebellious Druze, the word Durzi in Turkish came, and continues, to mean someone who is the ultimate thug. One influential Islamic sage of that time labeled them as infidels and argued that, even though they might behave like Muslims on the outside, this is no more than a pretense. He also declared that confiscation of Druze property and even the death sentence would conform to the laws of Islam.

Consequently, the 16th and 17th centuries were to witness a succession of armed Druze rebellions against the Ottomans, countered by repeated Ottoman punitive expeditions against the Chouf, in which the Druze population of the area was severely depleted and many villages destroyed. These military measures, severe as they were, did not succeed in reducing the local Druze to the required degree of subordination. This led the Ottoman government to agree to an arrangement whereby the different nahiyes (districts) of the Chouf would be granted in iltizam ("fiscal concession") to one of the region's amirs, or leading chiefs, leaving the maintenance of law and order and the collection of its taxes in the area in the hands of the appointed amir. This arrangement was to provide the cornerstone for the privileged status which ultimately came to be enjoyed by the whole of Mount Lebanon, Druze and Christian areas alike.

Ma'an dynasty 

With the advent of the Ottoman Turks and the conquest of Syria by Sultan Selim I in 1516, the Ma'ans were acknowledged by the new rulers as the feudal lords of southern Lebanon. Druze villages spread and prospered in that region, which under Ma'an leadership so flourished that it acquired the generic term of Jabal Bayt-Ma'an (the mountain home of the Ma'an) or Jabal al-Druze. The latter title has since been usurped by the Hawran region, which since the middle of the 19th century has proven a haven of refuge to Druze emigrants from Lebanon and has become the headquarters of Druze power.

Under Fakhr-al-Dīn II (Fakhreddin II), the Druze dominion increased until it included Lebanon-Phoenicia and almost all Syria, extending from the edge of the Antioch plain in the north to Safad in the south, with a part of the Syrian desert dominated by Fakhr-al-Din's castle at Tadmur (Palmyra), the ancient capital of Zenobia. The ruins of this castle still stand on a steep hill overlooking the town. Fakhr-al-Din became too strong for his Turkish sovereign in Constantinople. He went so far in 1608 as to sign a commercial treaty with Duke Ferdinand I of Tuscany containing secret military clauses. The Sultan then sent a force against him, and he was compelled to flee the land and seek refuge in the courts of Tuscany and Naples in 1613 and 1615 respectively.

In 1618, political changes in the Ottoman sultanate had resulted in the removal of many enemies of Fakhr-al-Din from power, signaling the prince's triumphant return to Lebanon soon afterwards. Through a clever policy of bribery and warfare, he extended his domains to cover all of modern Lebanon, some of Syria and northern Galilee.

In 1632, Küçük Ahmed Pasha was named Lord of Damascus. Küçük Ahmed Pasha was a rival of Fakhr-al-Din and a friend of the sultan Murad IV, who ordered the pasha and the sultanate's navy to attack Lebanon and depose Fakhr-al-Din.

This time the prince decided to remain in Lebanon and resist the offensive, but the death of his son Ali in Wadi al-Taym was the beginning of his defeat. He later took refuge in Jezzine's grotto, closely followed by Küçük Ahmed Pasha who eventually caught up with him and his family.

Fakhr-al-Din was captured, taken to Istanbul, and imprisoned with two of his sons in the infamous Yedi Kule prison. The Sultan had Fakhr-al-Din and his sons killed on 13 April 1635 in Istanbul, bringing an end to an era in the history of Lebanon, which would not regain its current boundaries until it was proclaimed a mandate state and republic in 1920. One version recounts that the younger son was spared, raised in the harem and went on to become Ottoman Ambassador to India.

Fakhr-al-Din II was the first ruler in modern Lebanon to open the doors of his country to foreign Western influences. Under his auspices the French established a khān (hostel) in Sidon, the Florentines a consulate, and Christian missionaries were admitted into the country. Beirut and Sidon, which Fakhr-al-Din II beautified, still bear traces of his benign rule. See the new biography of this Prince, based on original sources, by TJ Gorton: Renaissance Emir: a Druze Warlord at the Court of the Medici (London, Quartet Books, 2013), for an updated view of his life.

Fakhr ad Din II was succeeded in 1635 by his nephew Mulhim Ma'n, who ruled through his death in 1658. (Fakhr ad Din's only surviving son, Husayn, lived the rest of his life as a court official in Constantinople.) Emir Mulhim exercised Iltizam taxation rights in the Shuf, Gharb, Jurd, Matn, and Kisrawan districts of Lebanon. Mulhim's forces battled and defeated those of Mustafa Pasha, Beylerbey of Damascus, in 1642, but he is reported by historians to have been otherwise loyal to Ottoman rule.

Following Mulhim's death, his sons Ahmad and Korkmaz entered into a power struggle with other Ottoman-backed Druze leaders. In 1660, the Ottoman Empire moved to reorganize the region, placing the sanjaks (districts) of Sidon-Beirut and Safed in a newly formed province of Sidon, a move seen by local Druze as an attempt to assert control. Contemporary historian Istifan al-Duwayhi reports that Korkmaz was killed in act of treachery by the Beylerbey of Damascus in 1662. Ahmad however emerged victorious in the power struggle among the Druze in 1667, but the Maʿnīs lost control of Safad and retreated to controlling the iltizam of the Shuf mountains and Kisrawan. Ahmad continued as local ruler through his death from natural causes, without heir, in 1697.

During the Ottoman–Habsburg War (1683–1699), Ahmad Ma'n collaborated in a rebellion against the Ottomans which extended beyond his death. Iltizam rights in Shuf and Kisrawan passed to the rising Shihab family through female-line inheritance.

Shihab Dynasty 

As early as the days of Saladin, and while the Ma'ans were still in complete control over southern Lebanon, the Shihab tribe, originally Hijaz Arabs, but later settled in Ḥawran, advanced from Ḥawran, in 1172, and settled in Wadi al-Taym at the foot of mount Hermon. They soon made an alliance with the Ma'ans and were acknowledged as the Druze chiefs in Wadi al-Taym. At the end of the 17th century (1697) the Shihabs succeeded the Ma'ans in the feudal leadership of Druze southern Lebanon, although they reportedly professed Sunni Islam, they showed sympathy with Druzism, the religion of the majority of their subjects.

The Shihab leadership continued until the middle of the 19th century and culminated in the illustrious governorship of Amir Bashir Shihab II (1788–1840) who, after Fakhr-al-Din, was the most powerful feudal lord Lebanon produced. Though governor of the Druze Mountain, Bashir was a crypto-Christian, and it was he whose aid Napoleon solicited in 1799 during his campaign against Syria.

Having consolidated his conquests in Syria (1831–1838), Ibrahim Pasha, son of the viceroy of Egypt, Muhammad Ali Pasha, made the fatal mistake of trying to disarm the Christians and Druze of the Lebanon and to draft the latter into his army. This was contrary to the principles of the life of independence which these mountaineers had always lived, and resulted in a general uprising against Egyptian rule. The Druze of Wadi al-Taym and Ḥawran, under the leadership of Shibli al-Aryan, distinguished themselves in their stubborn resistance at their inaccessible headquarters, al-Laja, lying southeast of Damascus.

Qaysites and the Yemenites 

The conquest of Syria by the Muslim Arabs in the middle of the seventh century introduced into the land two political factions later called the Qaysites and the Yemenites. The Qaysite party represented the Bedouin Arabs who were regarded as inferior by the Yemenites who were earlier and more cultured emigrants into Syria from southern Arabia. Druze and Christians grouped in political, rather than religious, parties; the party lines in Lebanon obliterated ethnic and religious lines and the people grouped themselves into one or the other of these two parties regardless of their religious affiliations. The sanguinary feuds between these two factions depleted, in course of time, the manhood of the Lebanon and ended in the decisive battle of Ain Dara in 1711, which resulted in the utter defeat of the Yemenite party. Many Yemenite Druze thereupon migrated to the Hauran region, laying the foundation of Druze power there.

Civil conflict of 1860 

The relationship between the Druze and Christians has been characterized by harmony and coexistence, with amicable relations between the two groups prevailing throughout history, with the exception of some periods, including 1860 civil conflict in Mount Lebanon and Damascus. In 1840, social disturbance started between Druze and their Christian Maronite neighbors, who had previously been on friendly terms. This culminated in the civil war of 1860.

After the Shehab dynasty converted to Christianity, the Druze community and feudal leaders came under attack from the regime with the collaboration of the Maronite Catholic Church, and the Druze lost most of their political and feudal powers. Also, the Druze formed an alliance with Britain and allowed Protestant missionaries to enter Mount Lebanon, creating tension between them and the Catholic Maronites.

The Maronite-Druze conflict in 1840–60 was an outgrowth of the Maronite independence movement, directed against the Druze, Druze feudalism, and the Ottoman-Turks. The civil war was not therefore a religious war, except in Damascus, where it spread and where the vastly non-Druze population was anti-Christian. The movement culminated with the 1859–60 massacre and defeat of the Maronites by the Druze. The civil war of 1860 cost the Maronites some ten thousand lives in Damascus, Zahlé, Deir al-Qamar, Hasbaya, and other towns of Lebanon.

The European powers then determined to intervene, and authorized the landing in Beirut of a body of French troops under General Beaufort d'Hautpoul, whose inscription can still be seen on the historic rock at the mouth of Nahr al-Kalb. French intervention on behalf of the Maronites did not help the Maronite national movement, since France was restricted in 1860 by the British government, which did not want the Ottoman Empire dismembered. But European intervention pressured the Turks to treat the Maronites more justly. Following the recommendations of the powers, the Ottoman Porte granted Lebanon local autonomy, guaranteed by the powers, under a Maronite governor. This autonomy was maintained until World War I.

Rebellion in Hauran 

The Hauran rebellion was a violent Druze uprising against Ottoman authority in the Syrian province, which erupted in May 1909. The rebellion was led by al-Atrash family, originated in local disputes and Druze unwillingness to pay taxes and conscript into the Ottoman Army. The rebellion ended in brutal suppression of the Druze by General Sami Pasha al-Farouqi, significant depopulation of the Hauran region and execution of the Druze leaders in 1910. In the outcome of the revolt, 2,000 Druze were killed, a similar number wounded, and hundreds of Druze fighters imprisoned. Al-Farouqi also disarmed the population, extracted significant taxes, and launched a census of the region.

Modern history 
In Lebanon, Syria, Israel, and Jordan, the Druzites have official recognition as a separate religious community with its own religious court system. Druzites are known for their loyalty to the countries they reside in, though they have a strong community feeling, in which they identify themselves as related even across borders of countries.

Although most Druze no longer consider themselves Muslim, Al Azhar of Egypt recognized them in 1959 as one of the Islamic sects in the Al-Azhar Shia Fatwa due to political reasons, as Gamal Abdel Nasser saw it as a tool to spread his appeal and influence across the entire Arab world.

Despite their practice of blending with dominant groups to avoid persecution, and because the Druze religion does not endorse separatist sentiments, but urges blending with the communities they reside in, the Druze have had a history of resistance to occupying powers, and they have at times enjoyed more freedom than most other groups living in the Levant.

In Syria 

In Syria, most Druzites live in the Jebel al-Druze, a rugged and mountainous region in the southwest of the country, which is more than 90 percent Druze inhabited; some 120 villages are exclusively so. Other notable communities live in the Harim Mountains, the Damascus suburb of Jaramana, and on the southeast slopes of Mount Hermon. A large Syrian Druze community historically lived in the Golan Heights, but following wars with Israel in 1967 and 1973, many of these Druze fled to other parts of Syria; most of those who remained live in a handful of villages in the disputed zone, while only a few live in the narrow remnant of Quneitra Governorate that is still under effective Syrian control.

The Druze always played a far more important role in Syrian politics than its comparatively small population would suggest. With a community of little more than 100,000 in 1949, or roughly three percent of the Syrian population, the Druze of Syria's southwestern mountains constituted a potent force in Syrian politics and played a leading role in the nationalist struggle against the French. Under the military leadership of Sultan Pasha al-Atrash, the Druze provided much of the military force behind the Syrian Revolution of 1925–27. In 1945, Amir Hasan al-Atrash, the paramount political leader of the Jebel al-Druze, led the Druze military units in a successful revolt against the French, making the Jebel al-Druze the first and only region in Syria to liberate itself from French rule without British assistance. At independence the Druze, made confident by their successes, expected that Damascus would reward them for their many sacrifices on the battlefield. They demanded to keep their autonomous administration and many political privileges accorded them by the French and sought generous economic assistance from the newly independent government.

When a local paper in 1945 reported that President Shukri al-Quwatli (1943–49) had called the Druze a "dangerous minority", Sultan Pasha al-Atrash flew into a rage and demanded a public retraction. If it were not forthcoming, he announced, the Druze would indeed become "dangerous", and a force of 4,000 Druze warriors would "occupy the city of Damascus". Quwwatli could not dismiss Sultan Pasha's threat. The military balance of power in Syria was tilted in favor of the Druze, at least until the military build up during the 1948 War in Palestine. One advisor to the Syrian Defense Department warned in 1946 that the Syrian army was "useless", and that the Druze could "take Damascus and capture the present leaders in a breeze".

During the four years of Adib Shishakli's rule in Syria (December 1949 to February 1954) (on 25 August 1952: Adib al-Shishakli created the Arab Liberation Movement (ALM), a progressive party with pan-Arabist and socialist views), the Druze community was subjected to a heavy attack by the Syrian government. Shishakli believed that among his many opponents in Syria, the Druze were the most potentially dangerous, and he was determined to crush them. He frequently proclaimed: "My enemies are like a serpent: The head is the Jebel al-Druze, the stomach Homs, and the tail Aleppo. If I crush the head, the serpent will die." Shishakli dispatched 10,000 regular troops to occupy the Jebel al-Druze. Several towns were bombarded with heavy weapons, killing scores of civilians and destroying many houses. According to Druze accounts, Shishakli encouraged neighboring Bedouin tribes to plunder the defenseless population and allowed his own troops to run amok.

Shishakli launched a brutal campaign to defame the Druze for their religion and politics. He accused the entire community of treason, at times claiming they were in the employ of the British and Hashimites, at others that they were fighting for Israel against the Arabs. He even produced a cache of Israeli weapons allegedly discovered in the Jabal. Even more painful for the Druze community was his publication of "falsified Druze religious texts" and false testimonials ascribed to leading Druze sheikhs designed to stir up sectarian hatred. This propaganda also was broadcast in the Arab world, mainly Egypt. Shishakli was assassinated in Brazil on 27 September 1964 by a Druze seeking revenge for Shishakli's bombardment of the Jebel al-Druze.

He forcibly integrated minorities into the national Syrian social structure, his "Syrianization" of Alawite and Druze territories had to be accomplished in part using violence. To this end, al-Shishakli encouraged the stigmatization of minorities. He saw minority demands as tantamount to treason. His increasingly chauvinistic notions of Arab nationalism were predicated on the denial that "minorities" existed in Syria.

After the Shishakli's military campaign, the Druze community lost much of its political influence, but many Druze military officers played important roles in the Ba'ath government currently ruling Syria.

In 1967, a community of Druze in the Golan Heights came under Israeli control, today numbering 23,000 (in 2019).

The Qalb Loze massacre was a reported massacre of Syrian Druze on 10 June 2015 in the village of Qalb Loze in Syria's northwestern Idlib Governorate in which 20–24 Druze were killed. On 25 July 2018, a group of ISIS-affiliated attackers entered the Druze city of As-Suwayda and initiated a series of gunfights and suicide bombings on its streets, killing at least 258 people, the vast majority of them civilians.

In Lebanon 

The Druzite community in Lebanon played an important role in the formation of the modern state of Lebanon, and even though they are a minority they play an important role in the Lebanese political scene. Before and during the Lebanese Civil War (1975–90), the Druze were in favor of Pan-Arabism and Palestinian resistance represented by the PLO. Most of the community supported the Progressive Socialist Party formed by their leader Kamal Jumblatt and they fought alongside other leftist and Palestinian parties against the Lebanese Front that was mainly constituted of Christians. After the assassination of Kamal Jumblatt on 16 March 1977, his son Walid Jumblatt took the leadership of the party and played an important role in preserving his father's legacy after winning the Mountain War and sustained the existence of the Druze community during the sectarian bloodshed that lasted until 1990.

In August 2001, Maronite Catholic Patriarch Nasrallah Boutros Sfeir toured the predominantly Druze Chouf region of Mount Lebanon and visited Mukhtara, the ancestral stronghold of Druze leader Walid Jumblatt. The tumultuous reception that Sfeir received not only signified a historic reconciliation between Maronites and Druze, who fought a bloody war in 1983–1984, but underscored the fact that the banner of Lebanese sovereignty had broad multi-confessional appeal and was a cornerstone for the Cedar Revolution in 2005. Jumblatt's post-2005 position diverged sharply from the tradition of his family. He also accused Damascus of being behind the 1977 assassination of his father, Kamal Jumblatt, expressing for the first time what many knew he privately suspected. The BBC describes Jumblatt as "the leader of Lebanon's most powerful Druze clan and heir to a leftist political dynasty". The second largest political party supported by Druze is the Lebanese Democratic Party led by Prince Talal Arslan, the son of Lebanese independence hero Emir Majid Arslan.

In Israel

The Druzites form a religious minority in Israel of more than 100,000, mostly residing in the north of the country. In 2004, there were 102,000 Druze living in the country. In 2010, the population of Israeli Druze citizens grew to over 125,000. At the end of 2018, there were 143,000 in Israel and the Israeli-occupied portion of the Golan Heights. Most Israeli Druze identify ethnically as Arabs. Today, thousands of Israeli Druze belong to "Druze Zionist" movements.

Some scholars maintain that Israel has tried to separate the Druze from other Arab communities, and that the effort has influenced the way Israel's Druze perceive their modern identity.
In 1957, the Israeli government designated the Druze a distinct ethnic community at the request of its communal leaders. The Druze are Arabic-speaking citizens of Israel and serve in the Israel Defense Forces, just as most citizens do in Israel. Members of the community have attained top positions in Israeli politics and public service. The number of Druze parliament members usually exceeds their proportion in the Israeli population, and they are integrated within several political parties.

In Jordan 

The Druzites form a religious minority in Jordan of around 32,000, mostly residing in the northwestern part of the country.

Beliefs

God 
The Druze conception of the deity is declared by them to be one of strict and uncompromising unity. The main Druze doctrine states that God is both transcendent and immanent, in which he is above all attributes, but at the same time, he is present.

In their desire to maintain a rigid confession of unity, they stripped from God all attributes (tanzīh). In God, there are no attributes distinct from his essence. He is wise, mighty, and just, not by wisdom, might, and justice, but by his own essence. God is "the whole of existence", rather than "above existence" or on his throne, which would make him "limited". There is neither "how", "when", nor "where" about him; he is incomprehensible.

In this dogma, they are similar to the semi-philosophical, semi-religious body which flourished under Al-Ma'mun and was known by the name of Mu'tazila and the fraternal order of the Brethren of Purity (Ikhwan al-Ṣafa).

Unlike the Mu'tazila, and similar to some branches of Sufism, the Druze believe in the concept of Tajalli (meaning "theophany"). Tajalli is often misunderstood by scholars and writers and is usually confused with the concept of incarnation.

Scriptures 
Druze sacred texts include the Quran and the Epistles of Wisdom. Other ancient Druze writings include the Rasa'il al-Hind (Epistles of India) and the previously lost (or hidden) manuscripts such as al-Munfarid bi-Dhatihi and al-Sharia al-Ruhaniyya as well as others including didactic and polemic treatises.

Reincarnation 

Reincarnation is a paramount principle in the Druze faith. Reincarnations occur instantly at one's death because there is an eternal duality of the body and the soul and it is impossible for the soul to exist without the body. A human soul will transfer only to a human body, in contrast to the Neoplatonic, Hindu and Buddhist belief systems, according to which souls can transfer to any living creature. Furthermore, a male Druze can be reincarnated only as another male Druze and a female Druze only as another female Druze. A Druze cannot be reincarnated in the body of a non-Druze. Additionally, souls cannot be divided and the number of souls existing in the universe is finite. The cycle of rebirth is continuous and the only way to escape is through successive reincarnations. When this occurs, the soul is united with the Cosmic Mind and achieves the ultimate happiness.

Pact of Time Custodian 
The Pact of Time Custodian is considered the entrance to the Druze religion, and they believe that all Druze in their past lives have signed this Charter, and Druze believe that this Charter embodies with human souls after death.

I rely on our Moula Al-Hakim the lonely God, the individual, the eternal, who is out of couples and numbers, (someone) the son of (someone) has approved recognition enjoined on himself and on his soul, in a healthy of his mind and his body, permissibility aversive is obedient and not forced, to repudiate from all creeds, articles and all religions and beliefs on the differences varieties, and he does not know something except obedience of almighty Moulana Al-Hakim, and obedience is worship and that it does not engage in worship anyone ever attended or wait, and that he had handed his soul and his body and his money and all he owns to almighty Maulana Al-Hakim.

The Druze also use a similar formula, called al-'ahd, when one is initiated into the ʻUqqāl.

Sanctuaries 

The prayer-houses of the Druze are called khalwa or khalwat. The primary sanctuary of the Druze is at Khalwat al-Bayada.

Esotericism 
The Druze believe that many teachings given by prophets, religious leaders and holy books have esoteric meanings preserved for those of intellect, in which some teachings are symbolic and allegorical in nature, and divide the understanding of holy books and teachings into three layers.

These layers, according to the Druze, are as follows:
 The obvious or exoteric (zahir), accessible to anyone who can read or hear;
 The hidden or esoteric (batin), accessible to those who are willing to search and learn through the concept of exegesis;
 And the hidden of the hidden, a concept known as anagoge, inaccessible to all but a few really enlightened individuals who truly understand the nature of the universe.

Druze do not believe that the esoteric meaning abrogates or necessarily abolishes the exoteric one. Hamza bin Ali refutes such claims by stating that if the esoteric interpretation of taharah (purity) is purity of the heart and soul, it doesn't mean that a person can discard his physical purity, as salat (prayer) is useless if a person is untruthful in his speech and that the esoteric and exoteric meanings complement each other.

Seven Druze precepts 

The Druze follow seven moral precepts or duties that are considered the core of the faith.
The Seven Druze precepts are:
 Veracity in speech and the truthfulness of the tongue.
 Protection and mutual aid to the brethren in faith.
 Renunciation of all forms of former worship (specifically, invalid creeds) and false belief.
 Repudiation of the devil (Iblis), and all forces of evil (translated from Arabic Toghyan, meaning "despotism").
 Confession of God's unity.
 Acquiescence in God's acts no matter what they be.
 Absolute submission and resignation to God's divine will in both secret and public.

Taqiyya 
Complicating their identity is the custom of —concealing or disguising their beliefs when necessary—that they adopted from Ismailism and the esoteric nature of the faith, in which many teachings are kept secretive. This is done in order to keep the religion from those who are not yet prepared to accept the teachings and therefore could misunderstand it, as well as to protect the community when it is in danger. Some claim to be Muslim or Christian in order to avoid persecution; some do not. Druze in different states can have radically different lifestyles.

Theophany 
Hamza ibn Ali ibn Ahmad is considered the founder of the Druze and the primary author of the Druze manuscripts. He proclaimed that God had become human and taken the form of man. Al-Hakim bi-Amr Allah is an important figure in the Druze faith whose eponymous founder ad-Darazi proclaimed him as the incarnation of God in 1018.

Prophethood

Recognition of prophets in the Druze religion is divided into three sort-of subcategories, the prophet themselves (natiq), their disciples (asas), and witnesses to their message (hujjah). 

The number 5 contains an unstated significance within the Druze faith; it is believed in this area that great prophets come in groups of five. In the time of the ancient Greeks, these five were represented by Pythagoras, Plato, Aristotle, Parmenides, and Empedocles. In the first century, the five were represented by Jesus Christ, John the Baptist, Saint Matthew, Saint Mark, and Saint Luke. In the time of the faith's foundation, the five were Hamza ibn Ali ibn Ahmad, Muḥammad ibn Wahb al-Qurashī, Abū'l-Khayr Salama ibn Abd al-Wahhab al-Samurri, Ismāʿīl ibn Muḥammad at-Tamīmī, and Al-Muqtana Baha'uddin.

Druze believe that Hamza ibn Ali was a reincarnation of many prophets, including Jesus, Plato, Aristotle. Druze tradition honors and reveres Salman the Persian as "mentor" and "prophet", and believed to be reincarnations of the monotheistic idea.

Other beliefs 
The Druze allow divorce, although it is discouraged, and circumcision is not necessary. When al-Hakim returns, all faithful Druze will join him in his march from China and on to conquer the world. Apostasy is forbidden, and they usually have religious services on Thursday evenings. Druze follow Sunni Hanafi law on issues which their own faith has no particular rulings about.

Formal Druze worship is confined to weekly meeting on Thursday evenings, during which all members of community gather together to discuss local issues before those not initiated into the secrets of the faith (the juhhāl, or the ignorant) are dismissed, and those who are "uqqāl" or "enlightened" (those few initiated in the Druze holy books) remain to read and study.

Religious symbol  

The Druze strictly avoid iconography, but use five colors ("Five Limits"  ) as a religious symbol: green, red, yellow, blue, and white. The five limits were listed by Ismail at-Tamimi (d. 1030) in the Epistle of the Candle (risalat ash-sham'a) as:

 First limit: Hamza Ibn Ali (or Jesus according to other sources)
 Second limit: Ismail ibn Muhamed ibn Hamed at-Tamimi (Ismail at-Tamimi)
 Third limit: Muhamed ibn Wahb
 Fourth limit (as-Sabiq the anterior): Salama ibn abd al-Wahhab
 Fiifth limit (al-llahiq the posterior): Ali ibn Ahmed as-Samouqi

Each of the colors representing the five limits pertains to a metaphysical power called , literally "a limit", as in the distinctions that separate humans from animals, or the powers that make humans the animalistic body. Each  is color-coded in the following manner:
 Green for  "the Universal Mind/Intelligence/Nous",
 Red for  "the Universal Soul/Anima mundi",
 Yellow for  "the Word/Logos",
 Blue for  "the anterior/potentiality/cause/precedent", the first intellect.
 White for  "the posterior/future/effect/Immanence".

The mind generates qualia and gives consciousness. The soul embodies the mind and is responsible for transmigration and the character of oneself. The word, which is the atom of language, communicates qualia between humans and represents the platonic forms in the sensible world.

The colors can be arranged in vertically descending stripes (as a flag), or a five-pointed star. The stripes are a diagrammatic cut of the spheres in neoplatonic philosophy, while the five-pointed star embodies the golden ratio, phi, as a symbol of temperance and a life of moderation.

Prayer houses and holy places 

Holy places of the Druze are archaeological sites important to the community and associated with religious holidays; the most notable example being Nabi Shu'ayb, dedicated to Jethro, who is a central figure of the Druze religion. Druze make pilgrimages to this site on the holiday of Ziyarat al-Nabi Shu'ayb.

One of the most important features of the Druze village having a central role in social life is the —a house of prayer, retreat and religious unity.

The second type of religious shrine is one associated with the anniversary of a historic event or death of a prophet. If it is a mausoleum the Druze call it mazār and if it is a shrine they call it maqām. The holy places become more important to the community in times of adversity and calamity. The holy places and shrines of the Druze are scattered in various villages, in places where they are protected and cared for. They are found in Syria, Lebanon and Israel.

Initiates and "ignorant" members 

The Druze do not recognize any religious hierarchy. As such, there is no "Druze clergy". Those few initiated in the Druze holy books are called ʿuqqāl, while the "ignorant", regular members of the group are called juhhāl.

However, that term is seldom used by the Druze. The "juhhāl" are the vast majority of the Druze community. The cohesiveness and frequent inter-community social interaction, however, enables most Druze to have an idea about their broad ethical requirements and have some sense of what their theology consists of (albeit often flawed).

The initiated religious group, which includes both men and women (less than 10% of the population), is called  ( "the Knowledgeable Initiates"). They might or might not dress differently, although most wear a costume that was characteristic of mountain people in previous centuries. Women can opt to wear , a loose white veil, especially in the presence of other people. They wear  on their heads to cover their hair and wrap it around their mouths. They wear black shirts and long skirts covering their legs to their ankles. Traditionally the Druze women have played an important role both socially and religiously inside the community.

The most influential of  become , recognized religious leaders, and from this group the spiritual leaders of the Druze are assigned.

The Druze believe in the unity of God, and are often known as the "People of Monotheism" or simply "Monotheists". Their theology has a Neo-Platonic view about how God interacts with the world through emanations and is similar to some gnostic and other esoteric sects. Druze philosophy also shows Sufi influences. 

Druze principles focus on honesty, loyalty, filial piety, altruism, patriotic sacrifice, and monotheism. They reject nicotine, alcohol, and other drugs and often, the consumption of pork (to those Uqqāl and not necessarily to be required by the Juhhāl). Druze reject polygamy, believe in reincarnation, and are not obliged to observe most of the religious rituals. The Druze believe that rituals are symbolic and have an individualistic effect on the person, for which reason Druze are free to perform them, or not. The community does celebrate Eid al-Adha, however, considered their most significant holiday; though their form of observance is different compared to that of most Muslims.

Culture 

The life cycle of the average Druze ("juhhāl") revolves around a very small number of events – birth and circumcision, engagement and marriage, death and burial – and is devoid of special Druze prayers or worship. 

Marriage outside the Druze faith is forbidden and is strongly discouraged, and if a Druze marries a non-Druze, the Druze may be ostracized and marginalized by their community. Because a non-Druze partner cannot convert to Druze faith, the couple cannot have Druze children, because the Druze faith can only be passed on through birth to two Druze parents.

Circumcision is widely practiced by the Druze. The procedure is practiced as a cultural tradition, and has no religious significance in the Druze faith. There is no special date for this act in the Druze faith: male Druze infants are usually circumcised shortly after birth, however some remain uncircumcised until the age of ten or older. Some Druze do not circumcise their male children, and refuse to observe this "common Muslim practice".

Language 
The mother tongue of Druze in Syria, Lebanon and Israel is Levantine Arabic, except those born and lives in the Druze diaspora such as Venezuela, where Arabic was not taught or spoken at home. The Druze Arabic dialect, especially in the rural areas, is often different from the other regional Arabic dialects. Druze Arabic dialect is distinguished from others by retention of the phoneme /qāf/.

The Druze citizens of Israel are Arabic in language and culture, and linguistically speaking, the majority of them are fluently bilingual, speaking both a Central Northern Levantine Arabic dialect and Hebrew. In Druze Arab homes and towns in Israel, the primary language spoken is Arabic, while some Hebrew words have entered the colloquial Arabic dialect. They often use Hebrew characters to write their Arabic dialect online.

Cuisine 

Druze cuisine is similar to other Levantine cuisines and is rich in grains, meat, potato, cheese, bread, whole grains, fruits, vegetables, fresh fish and tomatoes. Perhaps the most distinctive aspect of Druze and Levantine cuisine is meze including tabbouleh, hummus and baba ghanoush. Kibbeh nayyeh is also a popular mezze among Druzes. Other famous foods among Druzes include falafel, sfiha, shawarma, dolma, kibbeh, kusa mahshi, shishbarak, muhammara, and mujaddara. Druze pita is a Druze-styled pita filled with labneh (thick yoghurt) and topped with olive oil and za’atar, and a very popular bread in Israel. Al-Meleh a popular dish among Druze in Hauran region (As-Suwayda Governorate), cooked in a pressure cooker and served on huge special plates at weddings, holidays, and other special occasions. And consists of bulgur wheat immersed in ghee with lamb and yogurt, and served hot with fried kibbeh and vegetables.

For reasons that remain unclear, the Mulukhiyah dish was banned by the Fatimid Caliph Al-Hakim bi-Amr Allah sometime during his reign (996–1021). While the ban was eventually lifted after the end of his reign, the Druze, who hold Al-Hakim in high regard and give him quasi-divine authority, continue to respect the ban, and do not eat Mulukhiyah of any kind to this day.

Mate (in Levantine Arabic,  /mæte/) is a popular drink consumed by the Druze brought to the Levant by Syrian migrants from Argentina in the 19th century. Mate is made by steeping dried leaves of the South American plant yerba mate in hot water and is served with a metal straw ( bambīja or  maṣṣāṣah) from a gourd ( finjān or  qarʻah). Mate is often the first item served when entering a Druze home. It is a social drink and can be shared between multiple participants. After each drinker, the metal straw is cleaned with lemon rind. Traditional snacks eaten with mate include raisins, nuts, dried figs, biscuits, and chips.

Druze and other religions

Relationship with Muslims 

The Druze faith is often classified as a branch of Isma'ili; although according to various scholars Druze faith "diverge substantially from Islam, both Sunni and Shia". Even though the faith originally developed out of Ismaili Islam, most Druze do not identify as Muslims, and they do not accept the five pillars of Islam. Historian David R. W. Bryer defines the Druzes as ghulat of Isma'ilism, since they exaggerated the cult of the caliph al-Hakim bi-Amr Allah and considered him divine; he also defines the Druzes as a religion that deviated from Islam. He also added that as a result of this deviation, the Druze faith "seems as different from Islam as Islam is from Christianity or Christianity is from Judaism".

Historically the relationship between the Druze and Muslims has been characterized by intense persecution. The Druze have frequently experienced persecution by different Muslim regimes such as the Shia Fatimid Caliphate, Mamluk, Sunni Ottoman Empire, and Egypt Eyalet. The persecution of the Druze included massacres, demolishing Druze prayer houses and holy places, and forced conversion to Islam. Those acts of persecution were meant to eradicate the whole community according to the Druze narrative. Most recently, the Syrian Civil War, which began in 2011, saw persecution of the Druze at the hands of Islamic extremists.

Since Druze emerged from Islam and share certain beliefs with Islam, its position of whether it is a separate religion or a sect of Islam is sometimes controversial among Muslim scholars. Druze are not considered Muslims by those belonging to orthodox Islamic schools of thought. Ibn Taymiyya, a prominent Muslim scholar muhaddith, dismissed the Druze as non-Muslims, and his fatwa cited that Druze: "Are not at the level of ′Ahl al-Kitāb (People of the Book) nor mushrikin (polytheists). Rather, they are from the most deviant kuffār (Infidel) ... Their women can be taken as slaves and their property can be seized ... they are to be killed whenever they are found and cursed as they described ... It is obligatory to kill their scholars and religious figures so that they do not misguide others", which in that setting would have legitimized violence against them as apostates. The Ottoman Empire often relied on Ibn Taymiyya’s religious ruling to justify their persecution of Druze. In contrast, according to Ibn Abidin, whose work Radd al-Muhtar 'ala al-Durr al-Mukhtar is still considered the authoritative text of Hanafi fiqh today, the Druze are neither Muslims nor apostates.

In 1959, in an ecumenical move driven by Egyptian president Gamal Abdel Nasser's effort to broaden his political appeal after the establishment of the United Arab Republic between Egypt and Syria in 1958, the Islamic scholar Mahmud Shaltut at Al Azhar University in Cairo classified the Druze as Muslims, even though most Druze no longer consider themselves Muslim. The fatwa declares that the Druze are Muslims because they recite the twofold Shahada, and believe in the Qur'an and monotheism and do not oppose Islam in word or deed. This fatwa was not accepted by all in the Islamic world, many dissenting scholars have argued the Druze recite the Shahada as a form of taqiya; a precautionary dissimulation or denial of religious belief and practice in the face of persecution. Some sects of Islam, including all Shia denominations, don't recognize the religious authority of Al Azhar University, those that do sometimes challenge the religious legitimacy of Shaltut's fatwa because it was issued for political reasons, as Gamal Abdel Nasser saw it as a tool to spread his appeal and influence across the entire Arab world.
In 2012, due to a drift towards Salafism in Al-Azhar, and the ascension of the Muslim Brotherhood into Egyptian political leadership, the dean of the Faculty of Islamic Studies at Al-Azhar issued a fatwa strongly opposed to the 1959 fatwa. 

Both religions venerate Shuaib and Muhammad: Shuaib (Jethro) is revered as the chief prophet in the Druze religion, and in Islam he is considered a prophet of God. Muslims regard Muhammad as the final and paromount prophet sent by God, to the Druze, Muhammad is exalted as one of the seven prophets sent by God in different periods of history.

In terms of religious comparison, Islamic schools and branches do not believe in reincarnation, a paramount tenet of the Druze faith. Islam teaches dawah, whereas the Druze do not accept converts to their faith. Marriage outside the Druze faith is rare and is strongly discouraged. Islamic schools and branches allow for divorce and permit men to be married to multiple women, contrary to the views of the Druze in monogamous marriage and not allowing divorce. Differences between Islamic schools and branches and Druze include their belief in the theophany, Hamza ibn Ali ibn Ahmad is considered the founder of the Druze and the primary author of the Druze manuscripts; he proclaimed that God had become human and taken the form of man, Al-Hakim bi-Amr Allah. Within Islam, however, such a concept of theophany is a denial of monotheism.

The Druze faith incorporates some elements of Islam, and other religious beliefs. Druze Sacred texts include the Qur'an and the Epistles of Wisdom (rasail al-hikma ) The Druze community does celebrate Eid al-Adha as their most significant holiday; though their form of observance is different compared to that of most Muslims. The Druze faith does not follow Sharia nor any of the Five Pillars of Islam save reciting the Shahada. Scholars argue that Druze recite the Shahada in order to protect their religion and their own safety, and to avoid persecution by Muslims.

Relationship with Christians 
 

Christianity and Druze are Abrahamic religions that share a historical traditional connection with some major theological differences. The two faiths share a common place of origin in the Middle East and consider themselves to be monotheistic.
The relationship between Druze and Christians has been characterized largely by harmony and peaceful coexistence. Amicable relations between the two groups prevailed throughout most of history, though a few exceptions exist, including the 1860 civil conflict in Mount Lebanon and Damascus. Conversion of Druze to Christianity used to be common practice in the Levant region. Over the centuries, a number of Druze embraced Christianity, such as some of Shihab dynasty members, as well as the Abi-Lamma clan.

Contact between Christian communities (members of the Maronites, Eastern Orthodox, Melkite, and other churches) and the Unitarian Druze led to the presence of mixed villages and towns in Mount Lebanon, Chouf, Jabal al-Druze, the Galilee region, Mount Carmel, and Golan Heights. The Maronite Catholic and the Druze founded modern Lebanon in the early Eighteenth Century, through a governing and social system known as the "Maronite-Druze dualism" in the Mount Lebanon Mutasarrifate.

Druze doctrine teaches that Christianity is to be "esteemed and praised" as the Gospel writers are regarded as "carriers of wisdom". The Druze faith incorporates some elements of Christianity, in addition to adoption of Christian elements on the Epistles of Wisdom. The full Druze canon or Druze scripture (Epistles of Wisdom) includes the Old Testament, the New Testament, the Quran and philosophical works by Plato and those influenced by Socrates among works from other religions and philosophers. The Druze faith shows influence of Christian monasticism, among other religious practices. 

In terms of religious comparison, mainstream Christian denominations do not believe in reincarnation or the transmigration of the soul, unlike the Druze. Evangelism is widely seen as central to the Christian faith, unlike the Druze who do not accept converts. Marriage outside the Druze faith is rare and is strongly discouraged. Similarities between the Druze and Christians include commonalities in their view of monogamous marriage, as well as the forbidding of divorce and remarriage, in addition to the belief in the oneness of God and theophany. 

Both mainstream Christian denominations and Druze does not require male circumcision, even though male circumcision is commonly practiced in many predominantly Christian countries and many Christian communities, and in Coptic Christianity and the Ethiopian Orthodox Church and the Eritrean Orthodox Tewahedo Church as a rite of passage. Male circumcision is also widely practiced by the Druze, but as a cultural tradition, since circumcision has no religious significance in the Druze faith. 

Both faiths give a prominent place to Jesus: In Christianity, Jesus is the central figure, seen as the messiah. To the Druze, Jesus is an important prophet of God, being among the seven prophets (including Muhammad) who appeared in different periods of history. The Druze revere Jesus "the son of Joseph and Mary" and his four disciples, who wrote the Gospels. According to the Druze manuscripts Jesus is the Greatest Imam and the incarnation of Ultimate Reason (Akl) on earth and the first cosmic principle (Hadd), and regards Jesus and Hamza ibn Ali as the incarnations of one of the five great celestial powers, who form part of their system. In the Druze tradition, Jesus is known under three titles: the True Messiah (al-Masih al-Haq), the Messiah of all Nations (Masih al-Umam), and the Messiah of Sinners. This is due, respectively, to the belief that Jesus delivered the true Gospel message, the belief that he was the Saviour of all nations, and the belief that he offers forgiveness.

Both religions venerate John the Baptist, Saint George, Elijah, Luke the Evangelist, Job and other common figures. Figures in the Old Testament such as Adam, Noah, Abraham, Moses, and Jethro are considered important prophets of God in the Druze faith, being among the seven prophets who appeared in different periods of history.

Relationship with Jews 

The relationship between the Druze and Jews has been controversial, Anti-Jewish bias material is contained in the Druze literature such as the Epistles of Wisdom; for example in an epistle ascribed to one of the founders of Druzism, Baha al-Din al-Muqtana, probably written sometime between AD 1027 and AD 1042, accused the Jews of crucifying Jesus. On the other hand, Benjamin of Tudela, a Jewish traveler from the 12th century, pointed out that the Druze maintained good commercial relations with the Jews nearby, and according to him this was because the Druze liked the Jewish people. Yet, the Jews and Druze lived isolated from each other, except in few mixed towns such as Deir al-Qamar and Peki'in. The Deir el Qamar Synagogue was built in 1638, during the Ottoman era in Lebanon, to serve the local Jewish population, some of whom were part of the immediate entourage of the Druze Emir Fakhr-al-Din II.

The conflict between Druze and Jews occurs during the Druze power struggle in Mount Lebanon, Jewish settlements of Galilee such as Safad and Tiberias were destroyed by the Druze in 1660. During the Druze revolt against the rule of Ibrahim Pasha of Egypt, the Jewish community in Safad was attacked by Druze rebels in early July 1838, the violence against the Jews included plundering their homes and desecrating their synagogues.

During the British Mandate for Palestine, the Druze did not embrace the rising Arab nationalism of the time or participate in violent confrontations with Jewish immigrants. In 1948, many Druze volunteered for the Israeli army and no Druze villages were destroyed or permanently abandoned. Since the establishment of the state of Israel, the Druze have demonstrated solidarity with Israel and distanced themselves from Arab and Islamic radicalism. Israeli Druze citizens serve in the Israel Defense Forces. The Jewish-Druze partnership was often referred as "a covenant of blood" (Hebrew: ברית דמים, brit damim) in recognition of the common military yoke carried by the two peoples for the security of the country.
From 1957, the Israeli government formally recognized the Druze as a separate religious community, and are defined as a distinct ethnic group in the Israeli Ministry of Interior's census registration. Israeli Druze do not consider themselves Muslim, and see their faith as a separate and independent religion. While compared to other Israeli Christians and Muslims, Druze place less emphasis on Arab identity and self-identify more as Israeli. However, they were less ready for personal relationships with Jews compared to Israeli Muslims and Christians.

In terms of religious comparison, scholars consider Judaism and the Druze faith as ethnoreligious groups, both practicing endogamy, and both typically do not proselytize. The belief in reincarnation had first existed among Jewish mystics in the Ancient World, among whom differing explanations were given of the afterlife, although with a universal belief in an immortal soul. Figures in the Hebrew Bible such as Adam, Noah, Abraham, and Moses are considered important prophets of God in the Druze faith, being among the seven prophets who appeared in different periods of history. Both religions venerate Elijah, Job and other common figures. In the Hebrew Bible, Jethro was Moses' father-in-law, a Kenite shepherd and priest of Midian. Jethro of Midian is considered an ancestor of the Druze who revere him as their spiritual founder and chief prophet.

Origins

Ethnic origins

Arabian hypothesis 
The Druze faith extended to many areas in the Middle East, but most of the modern Druze can trace their origin to the Wadi al-Taym in Southern Lebanon, which is named after an Arab tribe Taym Allah (or Taym Allat) which, according to Islamic historian al-Tabari, first came from the Arabian Peninsula into the valley of the Euphrates where they had been Christianized prior to their migration into Lebanon. Many of the Druze feudal families, whose genealogies have been preserved by the two modern Syrian chroniclers Haydar al-Shihabi and Ahmad Faris al-Shidyaq, seem also to point in the direction of this origin. Arabian tribes emigrated via the Persian Gulf and stopped in Iraq on their route that would later to lead them to Syria. The first feudal Druze family, the Tanukhids, which made for itself a name in fighting the Crusaders was, according to Haydar al-Shihabi, an Arab tribe from Mesopotamia where it occupied the position of a ruling family and apparently was Christianized.

Travelers like Niebuhr, and scholars like Max von Oppenheim, undoubtedly echoing the popular Druze belief regarding their own origin, have classified them as Arabs.

Druze as a mixture of Western Asian tribes 
The 1911 edition of Encyclopædia Britannica states that the Druze are "a mixture of refugee stocks, in which the Arab largely predominates, grafted on to an original mountain population of Aramaic blood".

Iturean hypothesis 
According to Jewish contemporary literature, the Druze, who were visited and described in 1165 by Benjamin of Tudela, were pictured as descendants of the Itureans, an Ismaelite Arab tribe, which used to reside in the northern parts of the Golan plateau through Hellenistic and Roman periods. The word Druzes, in an early Hebrew edition of his travels, occurs as Dogziyin, but it is clear that this is a scribal error.

Archaeological assessments of the Druze region have also proposed the possibility of Druze descending from Itureans, who had inhabited Mount Lebanon and Golan Heights in late classic antiquity, but their traces fade in the Middle Ages.

Genetics 

Lebanese Christians and Druze became a genetic isolate in the predominantly Islamic world.

In a 2005 study of ASPM gene variants, Mekel-Bobrov et al. found that the Israeli Druze people of the Mount Carmel region have among the highest rate of the newly evolved ASPM- Haplogroup D, at 52.2% occurrence of the approximately 6,000-year-old allele. While it is not yet known exactly what selective advantage is provided by this gene variant, the Haplogroup D allele is thought to be positively selected in populations and to confer some substantial advantage that has caused its frequency to rapidly increase.

A 2004 DNA study has shown that Israeli Druze are remarkable for the high frequency (35%) of males who carry the Y-chromosomal haplogroup L, which is otherwise uncommon in the Middle East (Shen et al. 2004). This haplogroup originates from prehistoric South Asia and has spread from Pakistan into southern Iran. A 2008 study done on larger samples showed that L-M20 averages 27% in Mount Carmel Druze, 2% in Galilee Druze, 8% in Lebanese Druze, and it was not found in a sample of 59 Syrian Druze (Slush et al. 2008).

Cruciani, in 2007, found E1b1b1a2 (E-V13) [a subclade of E1b1b1a (E-M78)] in high levels (>10% of the male population) in Cypriot and Druze lineages. Recent genetic clustering analyses of ethnic groups are consistent with the close ancestral relationship between the Druze and Cypriots, and also identified similarity to the general Syrian and Lebanese populations, as well as a variety of Jewish groups (Ashkenazi, Sephardi, Iraqi, and Moroccan) (Behar et al. 2010).

Also, a new study concluded that the Druze harbor a remarkable diversity of mitochondrial DNA lineages that appear to have separated from each other thousands of years ago. But instead of dispersing throughout the world after their separation, the full range of lineages can still be found within the Druze population.

The researchers noted that the Druze villages contained a striking range of high frequency and high diversity of the X haplogroup, suggesting that this population provides a glimpse into the past genetic landscape of the Near East at a time when the X haplogroup was more prevalent.

These findings are consistent with the Druze oral tradition that claims that the adherents of the faith came from diverse ancestral lineages stretching back tens of thousands of years. The Shroud of Turin analysis shows significant traces of mitochondrial DNA unique to the Druze community.

A 2008 study published on the genetic background of Druze communities in Israel showed highly heterogeneous parental origins. A total of 311 Israeli Druze were sampled: 37 from the Golan Heights, 183 from the Galilee, and 35 from Mount Carmel, as well as 27 Druze immigrants from Syria and 29 from Lebanon (Slush et al. 2008). The researchers found the following frequencies of Y-chromosomal and MtDNA haplogroups:
 Mount Carmel: L 27%, R 27%, J 18%, E 15%, G 12%.
 Galilee: J 31%, R 20%, E 18%, G 14%, K 11%, Q 4%, L 2%.
 Golan Heights: J 54%, E 29%, I 8%, G 4%, C 4%.
 Lebanon: J 58%, K 17%, Q 8%, R 8%, L 8%.
 Syria: J 39%, E 29%, R 14%, G 14%, K 4%.
Maternal MtDNA haplogroup frequencies: H 32%, X 13%, K 12.5%, U 10 %, T 7.5%, HV 4.8 %, J 4.8%, I 3.5%, pre HV 3%, L2a3 2.25%, N1b 2.25%, M1 1.6%, W 1.29%.  

According to a 2015 study, Druze have a largely similar genome with Middle Eastern Arabs, but they have not married outside of their clans in 1000 years and Druze families from different regions share a similarity with each other that distinguishes them from other Middle Eastern populations.

A 2016 study based on testing samples of Druze in the historic region of Syria, in comparison with ancient humans (including Anatolian and Armenian), and on Geographic Population Structure (GPS) tool by converting genetic distances into geographic distances, concluded that Druze might hail from the Zagros Mountains and the surroundings of Lake Van in eastern Anatolia, then they later migrated south to settle in the mountainous regions in Syria, Lebanon and Israel.

A 2020 study on remains from Canaanaite (Bronze Age southern Levantine) populations suggests a significant degree of genetic continuity in currently Arabic-speaking Levantine populations (including the Druze, Lebanese, Palestinians, and Syrians), as well as in most Jewish groups (including Sephardi Jews, Ashkenazi Jews, Mizrahi Jews, and Maghrebi Jews) from the populations of the Bronze Age Levant, suggesting that the aforementioned groups all derive more than half of their overall ancestry (atDNA) from Canaanite / Bronze Age Levantine populations, albeit with varying sources and degrees of admixture from differing host or invading populations depending on each group.

In a principal component analysis of a 2014 study, Druze were located between Lebanese people and Mizrahi Jews. In a PCA in a 2021 study, Druze were close to Lebanese people and a part of the larger Levant-Iraq cluster.

See also 
 Sword Battalion
 Jaysh al-Muwahhideen
 Jabal Druze State
 List of Druze
 Neoplatonism and Gnosticism
 Religious syncretism
 Christianity and Druze

References

Notes

Citations

Bibliography 
 
 .
 .

Further reading 
 Jean-Marc Aractingi, La Face Cachée des Druzes " Les Francs-Maçons de l'Orient", 251 pages, Editeur : Independently published (6 juillet 2020), 
 Jean-Marc Aractingi, "Les Druzes et la Franc-maçonnerie", in Les Cahiers de l'Orient, no. 69, 1er trimestre 2003, Paris: L'Équerre et le Croissant, éditions Les Cahiers de l'Orient
 Jean-Marc Aractingi, "Points de convergence dans les rituels et symboles chez les Druzes et chez les francs-maçons", in Les Cahiers, Jean Scot Erigène, no 8, Franc-maçonnerie et Islamité, Paris: la Grande Loge de France.
 Pinhas Inabri "Pan-Arabism versus Pan-Islam – Where Do the Druze Fit?"- Pan-Arabism versus Pan-Islam – Where Do the Druze Fit?
 
 .
 Rabih Alameddine I, the Divine: A Novel in First Chapters, Norton (2002). .
 B. Destani, ed. Minorities in the Middle East: Druze Communities 1840–1974, 4 volumes, Slough: Archive Editions (2006). .
 R. Scott Kennedy "The Druze of the Golan: A Case of Non-Violent Resistance" Journal of Palestine Studies, Vol. 13, No. 2 (Winter, 1984), pp. 48–6.
 Dr. Anis Obeid: The Druze & Their Faith in Tawhid, Syracuse University Press (July 2006). .
 
 Samy Swayd The Druzes: An Annotated Bibliography, Kirkland, Washington: ISES Publications (1998). .
 Bashar Tarabieh "Education, Control and Resistance in the Golan Heights". Middle East Report, No. 194/195, Odds against Peace (May–August 1995), pp. 43–47.
 
 Dr. Said Hany: Druze Trilogy 1- Philosophy. USA. 2020. ISBN 978-0-244-23549-9. Druze Trilogy 2- Theology. USA. 2020. ISBN 978-0-244-23701-1. Druze Trilogy 3- Genealogy. USA. 2020. ISBN 978-0-244-83701-3.

External links 

 

 
Articles containing video clips
Abrahamic religions
Esoteric schools of thought
Ethnoreligious groups
Ethnic groups in Syria
Ethnic groups in Lebanon
Ethnoreligious groups in Israel
Ethnic groups in Jordan
Gnosticism
Hermeticism
Monotheistic religions
Mysticism
Neoplatonism
Pythagorean philosophy
Arab groups
Ethnic groups in the Middle East
Ethnic religion